Carl Froch vs. Mikkel Kessler was a championship fight for the World Boxing Council (WBC) Super Middleweight championship on 24 April 2010 in Herning, Denmark.

Background
Froch defeated Andre Dirrell by split decision in his third WBC super-middleweight title defense which was a very controversial win with many believing Dirrell had won. Nevertheless, Froch got the win and the 2 points for his victory.
Meanwhile, WBA Champion Kessler was upset in his first Super Six match against Andre Ward who won via an 11th round technical decision.

In the buildup to the fight there were concerns that the Icelandic volcanic ash eruptions would cause the fight to be disrupted, but it went head as planned .

The fight
In a closely fought contest where both men had great moments throughout the fight, Kessler took Froch's title and inflicted Froch's first professional defeat via unanimous decision, the judges scoring the contest by margins of 116–112, 115–113 and 117–111. The scoring was somewhat controversial, as some boxing announcers had scored the fight much closer, with some awarding Froch the win and others scoring it a draw. Froch later stated that the fight was close and that he believes the decision would have gone his way if the event had been held in Nottingham. The fight was a contender for the 2010 Fight of the Year.

Aftermath
In August, Kessler announced he was withdrawing from the Super Six tournament due to the worsening of the eye injury he suffered during his earlier fight against Andre Ward, vacating the WBC belt in the progress. WBC, after initially announcing that it would grant the belt to the winner of the upcoming Group Stage 3 match between its number one contender Andre Dirrell and the WBA champion Ward, it was confirmed that the WBC would grant its championship to the winner of the scheduled match between Froch and Arthur Abraham, which Froch won to retain title.

Froch and Kessler would fight a rematch in 2013, with Froch winning by unanimous decision in London.

Undercard
Confirmed bouts:

References

Boxing matches
2010 in boxing
Boxing in Denmark
Sport in Herning
2010 in Danish sport
April 2010 sports events in Europe